Zagross Khodro was an Iranian industrial concern, which manufactures automobiles in Borujerd for the domestic Iranian market. It was established in 1996. The company's headquarters was located in Tehran.

Zagross Khodro was set up as a private complete knock down (CKD) assembler in July 2002 and has a deal with Proton to produce the Proton Wira and Proton Gen-2 range of hatchbacks and sedans. As the factory has capacity to make 50,000 cars, Zagross Khodro was looking toward other car firms in order to assemble a range of different car brands in the future.

External links
Official Zagross Khodro pages in English 

Car manufacturers of Iran
Manufacturing companies based in Tehran
Vehicle manufacturing companies established in 1996
1996 establishments in Iran